Kyser Lake is a lake on the Herkimer County and Fulton County line, located south of Dolgeville, New York. East Canada Creek is the main inlet. Kyser Lake drains south via East Canada Creek which flows into the Mohawk River.

References

Lakes of New York (state)
Lakes of Herkimer County, New York
Lakes of Montgomery County, New York